The western dwarf skink (Menetia surda) is a species of skink found in Western Australia.

References

Menetia
Reptiles described in 1976
Skinks of Australia
Endemic fauna of Australia
Taxa named by Glen Milton Storr